Metropolitano International Airport  is an airport serving the city of Ocumare del Tuy,  south of Caracas, in the Miranda state of Venezuela.

See also
Transport in Venezuela
List of airports in Venezuela

References

External links
OurAirports - Metropolitano
SkyVector - Metropolitano

Airports in Venezuela